IS Göta are a Swedish sport club from Helsingborg founded in 1898. The club has had sections in athletics, football, bandy, ice hockey, tennis and handball. The handball team was promoted to Allsvenskan in 1965 and won the league in their debut season, earning the title of Swedish champions. They finished third in the following season, but after that their performances declined and they were relegated in 1970. The handball section was discontinued in 1981.

Now, in 2019, IS Göta has three sections: Athletics & Triathon, Tennis and Bowling. Athletics & Triathlon is the biggest section and here is a photo of the IS Göta participants in the local 10k race Springtime 2017 in Helsingborg.

References

Swedish handball clubs
1898 establishments in Sweden
Association football clubs established in 1898
Bandy clubs established in 1898
Handball clubs established in 1898
Football clubs in Skåne County
Sport in Helsingborg
Multi-sport clubs in Sweden